Jason Morgan (born 6 October 1982) is a Jamaican discus thrower. On 6 June 2015 Morgan achieved the Jamaican record in the discus throw (68.19meters).

He won the silver medal at the 2006 Central American and Caribbean Games. He also competed at the 2007 World Championships 2011 World Championships and 2012 Summer Olympics without reaching the final.

Achievements

Competition record

See also
List of Jamaican records in athletics

References

External links
 

1982 births
Living people
Athletes (track and field) at the 2007 Pan American Games
Athletes (track and field) at the 2011 Pan American Games
Jamaican male discus throwers
Louisiana Tech University alumni
Olympic athletes of Jamaica
Athletes (track and field) at the 2012 Summer Olympics
Athletes (track and field) at the 2014 Commonwealth Games
Sportspeople from Kingston, Jamaica
World Athletics Championships athletes for Jamaica
Commonwealth Games medallists in athletics
Commonwealth Games bronze medallists for Jamaica
Central American and Caribbean Games gold medalists for Jamaica
Competitors at the 2002 Central American and Caribbean Games
Competitors at the 2006 Central American and Caribbean Games
Competitors at the 2010 Central American and Caribbean Games
Central American and Caribbean Games medalists in athletics
Pan American Games competitors for Jamaica
Medallists at the 2014 Commonwealth Games